Valérie Gomez-Bassac (born 16 July 1969) is a French politician of La République En Marche! (LREM) who was a member of the French National Assembly since the 2017 to 2022, representing the department of Var.

Political career
In parliament, Gomez-Bassac served as member of the Committee on Cultural Affairs and Education and the Committee on European Affairs. In addition to her committee assignments, she was part of the French-Moroccan Parliamentary Friendship Group.

Since 2019, Gomez-Bassac was one of her parliamentary group's spokespersons under the leadership of its chairman Gilles Le Gendre.

She lost her seat in the 2022 French legislative election to Frank Giletti from the National Rally.

Political positions
In July 2019, Gomez-Bassac voted in favor of the French ratification of the European Union’s Comprehensive Economic and Trade Agreement (CETA) with Canada.

Other activities
 Institut Français, Member of the Advisory Board (since 2017)

See also
 2017 French legislative election

References

1969 births
Living people
Deputies of the 15th National Assembly of the French Fifth Republic
La République En Marche! politicians
21st-century French women politicians
People from Valenciennes
Politicians from Hauts-de-France
Women members of the National Assembly (France)